A.O. Xanthi Ground is a football stadium in Xanthi, Greece. It hosted Skoda Xanthi until the team moved to the Skoda Xanthi Arena in 2004. It is currently used by Orfeas Xanthi who play in the Gamma Ethniki. The stadium holds 9,500 and was built in 1970.

References

External links

Buildings and structures completed in 1970
Football venues in Greece
Xanthi